Demodioides is a genus of beetle in the family Cerambycidae. Its only species is Demodioides transversevittata. It was described by Stephan von Breuning in 1947.

References

Pteropliini
Beetles described in 1947